The 1913 Utah Agricultural Aggies football team was an American football team that represented Utah Agricultural College (later renamed Utah State University) during the 1913 college football season. In their fifth season under head coach Clayton Teetzel, the Aggies compiled a 3–3 record and outscored opponents by a total of 97 to 69.

Schedule

References

Utah Agricultural
Utah State Aggies football seasons
Utah State Aggies football